"Ain't It Fun" is a song written by Peter Laughner and Gene O'Connor (known as Cheetah Chrome) and performed by their protopunk band Rocket from the Tombs. The song was first released by O'Connor's later group, Dead Boys, on their 1978 second studio album We Have Come for Your Children. Laughner died a year before.

Lyrics
"Ain't It Fun" is notable for being one of the first commercially-released recordings of song lyrics containing the profanity cunt, which is said once in the song's third verse. The word's presence was not picked up on by the media at the time, with the same being the case following the release of Guns N' Roses' 1993 cover, which reached the top 10 in several countries' singles charts despite being uncensored.

Guns N' Roses version

The song was later covered by the American rock band Guns N' Roses for their 1993 cover album "The Spaghetti Incident?". It was also released as a single and was included on the Guns N' Roses  Greatest Hits compilation in 2004. Michael Monroe from Hanoi Rocks featured in the song on vocals.

Charts

Other covers
When Rocket from the Tombs reunited in 2003, they recorded the song and released it on their debut album, Rocket Redux. Rollins Band also covered the song for their album A Nicer Shade of Red. The Lords of Altamont covered the song on their 2011 album Midnight to 666.

Notes

Sources

Cheetah Chrome and Legs McNeil, (2010). Cheetah Chrome: A Dead Boy's Tale: From the Front Lines of Punk Rock (Voyageur Press; First edition). .

1978 singles
1993 singles
Guns N' Roses songs
Song recordings produced by Felix Pappalardi
1978 songs
Sire Records singles